Liv Strömquist (born February 3, 1978) is a Swedish comics artist and radio presenter.

Life and career 
Strömquist was born in Lund and grew up in Ravlunda in the Österlen region of south Sweden. Today she lives in Malmö. Already as a five-year old she made her own comics, but stopped, until she took up drawing comics at the age of 23. Her flatmate made her interested in comic fanzines then. With Rikedomen, she published her first own fanzine.

Her breakthrough as a comic artist followed with her first album Hundra procent fett ("One hundred percent fat"), which was published in 2005. She regularly publishes in the comic magazine Galago in various magazines and newspapers such as Dagens Nyheter, Dagens Arbete, Bang, Aftonbladet and Ordfront Magasin. She designed the cover for the 2013 album Shaking the Habitual by the band The Knife. She also made a comic strip for the band's website, which depicted income inequality in a satirical manner.

Several of her books have been translated into French. Kunskapens frukt about the taboo of menstruation and the vulva in society has also been translated into Dutch, Danish, German, Finnish, English, Russian, Spanish, Italian, Bulgarian, Slovene and Ukrainian.

She studied political science. Her comics are mostly about sociopolitical issues from a feminist and left-wing perspective. They are satirical essay about power and injustices.

Since 2005, she has been working for the youth radio station Sveriges Radio P3. She was involved in the satirical programs Tankesmedjan and Pang Prego. Together with the author Caroline Ringskog Ferrada-Noli, she runs the podcast En varg söker sin pod for the newspaper Expressen. In the SVT program Liv och Horace i Europa, which was broadcast in spring 2016, she travelled through Europe together with Horace Engdahl and discussed the lives of various authors.

Awards 
 Adamson Award 2012
 EWK Award 2013
Kolla! 2020

Works 
 Hundra procent fett. Ordfront/Galago 2005.
 Drift. Kolik förlag 2007 (together with Jan Bielecki).
 Einsteins fru. Ordfront/Galago 2008.
 Prins Charles Känsla. Ordfront/Galago 2010.
 Ja till Liv!. Ordfront/Galago 2011.
 Månadens moderat Kalender 2013. Ordfront Förlag 2013.
 Kunskapens frukt. Ordfront/Galago 2014. (Engl. transl. Fruit of Knowledge, Virago Press 2018.)
 Kära Liv och Caroline. Natur & Kultur 2015 (together with Caroline Ringskog Ferrada-Noli).
 Uppgång & Fall. Ordfront/Galago 2016.
 Den rödaste rosen slår ut. Ordfront/Galago 2019.
 Inne i spegelsalen. Norstedts 2021.

References 

Swedish comics artists
Swedish feminists
Swedish radio presenters
Swedish female comics artists
Swedish women radio presenters
Album-cover and concert-poster artists
1978 births
People from Malmö
Living people